Elections to Newtownabbey Borough Council were held on 20 May 1981 on the same day as the other Northern Irish local government elections. The election used four district electoral areas to elect a total of 21 councillors.

Election results

Note: "Votes" are the first preference votes.

Districts summary

|- class="unsortable" align="centre"
!rowspan=2 align="left"|Ward
! % 
!Cllrs
! % 
!Cllrs
! %
!Cllrs
! %
!Cllrs
!rowspan=2|TotalCllrs
|- class="unsortable" align="center"
!colspan=2 bgcolor="" | UUP
!colspan=2 bgcolor="" | DUP
!colspan=2 bgcolor="" | Alliance
!colspan=2 bgcolor="white"| Others
|-
|align="left"|Area A
|bgcolor="#40BFF5"|45.3
|bgcolor="#40BFF5"|2
|32.2
|2
|10.8
|0
|11.7
|1
|5
|-
|align="left"|Area B
|bgcolor="#40BFF5"|37.0
|bgcolor="#40BFF5"|2
|34.8
|1
|11.6
|1
|16.6
|1
|6
|-
|align="left"|Area C
|bgcolor="#40BFF5"|34.2
|bgcolor="#40BFF5"|2
|33.7
|1
|19.1
|1
|13.0
|0
|5
|-
|align="left"|Area D
|25.2
|2
|bgcolor="#D46A4C"|37.3
|bgcolor="#D46A4C"|1
|17.5
|1
|20.0
|1
|5
|-
|- class="unsortable" class="sortbottom" style="background:#C9C9C9"
|align="left"| Total
|34.5
|9
|34.7
|5
|15.6
|3
|15.2
|4
|21
|-
|}

Districts results

Area A

1977: 3 x UUP, 1 x DUP, 1 x Alliance
1981: 2 x UUP, 2 x DUP, 1 x Independent Unionist
1977-1981 Change: DUP and Independent Unionist gain from UUP and Alliance

Area B

1977: 2 x UUP, 1 x DUP, 1 x Alliance, 1 x Newtownabbey Labour, 1 x Loyalist
1981: 3 x UUP, 1 x DUP, 1 x Alliance, 1 x Newtownabbey Labour
1977-1981 Change: Loyalist joins UUP

Area C

1977: 2 x Alliance, 1 x UUP, 1 x DUP, 1 x UPNI
1981: 2 x UUP, 1 x DUP, 1 x Alliance, 1 x Independent Unionist
1977-1981 Change: UUP and Independent Unionist gain from Alliance and UPNI

Area D

1977: 2 x Alliance, 2 x UUP, 1 x DUP
1981: 2 x UUP, 1 x DUP, 1 x Alliance, 1 x Independent Unionist
1977-1981 Change: Independent Unionist gain from Alliance

References

Newtownabbey Borough Council elections
Newtownabbey